Rosenrot ("Rose-Red") is the fifth studio album by German Neue Deutsche Härte band Rammstein, released on 28 October 2005. The album includes six songs artistically omitted from Reise, Reise. The album's first title was Reise, Reise Volume Two, but on 18 August 2005 the album was announced as Rosenrot. The cover art is nearly identical to the Japanese import of Reise, Reise. The image is a slightly altered photograph of the icebreaker USS Atka, taken on 13 March 1960 at McMurdo Station, Ross Ice Shelf, Antarctica.

While Rammstein did not actively promote the album, the band built anticipation through a variety of means. The first single from the album, "Benzin", premiered at the Berliner Wuhlheide and was subsequently released on disc. Rammstein's official website featured one-minute samples from six of the tracks, and had featured a prominent release-date countdown. A brief section of the chorus from "Rosenrot" plays in the background of an e-card containing photographs of the band and basic album information. As of February 2006, the album had shipped 1 million copies globally.

Track listing

There is a compact cassette available (side A = 1–6; B = 7–11)
The US version features a parental advisory label that is printed on the cover.

Limited edition bonus DVD
The limited edition includes the normal CD plus a DVD with three live performances:
 Reise, Reise (Arena of Nîmes, Nîmes / France July 2005)
 Mein Teil (Club Citta, Kanagawa / Japan June 2005)
 Sonne (Brixton Academy, London / UK February 2005)

All bonus performances were later featured on the DVD Völkerball.

 The Limited Edition featured slightly altered artwork, namely "Limited Edition" printed in white on the top left corner, and the band and album name is reflective.
 The US version is the Special Edition, with that printed on the top left corner and the parental advisory logo below, alongside the reflective band and album name.
 The Japanese version, released in 2009, has a SHMCD and the DVD.

Personnel
Rammstein
Till Lindemann – vocals
Christoph Schneider – drums
Christian Lorenz – keyboards
Oliver Riedel – bass guitar
Richard Kruspe – lead guitar, backing vocals
Paul Landers – rhythm guitar, backing vocals
Additional musicians
Sharleen Spiteri – vocals (track 6)
Bobo – backing vocals (track 6)
Christo Hermanndos – trumpet (track 9)
Carmen Zapata – vocals (track 9)
Olsen Involtini – string arrangement (track 8)
Sven Helbig – trumpet arrangement (track 9)
Matthias Wilke – choir conductor (tracks 1, 2 & 4)
Production
Produced by Jacob Hellner

Release history

Charts

Weekly charts

Year-end charts

Certifications and sales

References

External links

 Official Rosenrot information page 
 Official Rosenrot information page 

2005 albums
Rammstein albums
German-language albums